Bryn Mawr (pronounced  from Welsh for "big hill") is a neighborhood within the Calhoun-Isles community in Minneapolis located directly west of downtown Minneapolis. Prior to the 1960s, the neighborhood was home to many workers of the nearby Minneapolis and St. Louis Railway yard. The neighborhood is all residential with two small business clusters, and a majority of it is surrounded by parks and hiking trails. The west-northwest border is adjacent to Theodore Wirth Park, while the southwestern perimeter borders Saint Louis Park.

In addition to Theodore Wirth Park, Bryn Mawr is bound by more parkland: Bassett Creek to the north, the Bryn Mawr Meadows park to the east, and Cedar Lake and Cedar Lake park to the south. Nearby neighborhoods include Harrison to the north, Lowry Hill to the southeast, and Kenwood and Cedar-Isles-Dean to the south.

Demographics
As of 2020, the population of Bryn-Mawr was 2,768, split 46.8% male and 53.2% female 99.6% of residents were at least a high school graduate (or equivalent), and 71.8% had earned a bachelor's degree or higher. 

3.2% of the population were foreign-born residents, and 5.8% spoke a language other than English at home.

Less than 1% of households had no access to a vehicle. Among workers 16 years and older, 75.1% commuted to work via car, 22.0% walked, biked, or worked at home, with the rest using public transit or some other method. The median household income in Bryn-Mawr was $106,310. 6.2% of residents lived below the poverty line, and 7.3% were unemployed. 85.2% of housing in the neighborhood was owner-occupied.

References

External links
Bryn Mawr Elementary
City of Minneapolis: Bryn Mawr Neighborhood Profile
Bryn Mawr Neighborhood Association

Neighborhoods in Minneapolis